The Museo del Aire was a national aviation museum located in the south-western suburbs of Havana, Cuba. Until August 2010, the Museum address was: Museo del Aire, Avenida 212, entre la avenida 29 y 31, La Coronela, La Lisa. In about August 2010, the museum was closed, and the entire collection was moved to San Antonio de los Baños Air Base, no further details known.

Aircraft on display
Source: Ogden

See also

List of aerospace museums
List of museums in Cuba
Museum of the Revolution (Cuba) (Museo de la Revolución)

Notes

External links
MuseumAviation.eu: Museo_del_Aire

Museums in Havana
Aerospace museums
History museums
Air force museums